Khizer Dafedar (born 10 October 1997) is an Indian cricketer. He made his Twenty20 debut for Mumbai in the 2017–18 Zonal T20 League on 10 January 2018.

References

External links
 

1997 births
Living people
Indian cricketers
Mumbai cricketers
Place of birth missing (living people)